Historia de la frivolidad is a 1967 Spanish television special by Televisión Española, directed by Narciso Ibáñez Serrador, written by himself and Jaime de Armiñán, with music by Augusto Algueró and drawings by Mingote. It first aired on February 9, 1967. It relates, through a series of humorous sketches, the history of eroticism, and the efforts of the censors of all ages to conceal it.

Plot
The president of the Women's League against Frivolity delivers a speech to would-be censors, and shows the History of eroticism, through a series of sketches, from Adam and Eve to the near future, praising the efforts to conceal any glimpse of impudence.

Production
Jesús Aparicio-Bernal, Director-General of RTVE back then, Adolfo Suárez, Director of Programmes of Televisión Española, and Juan José Rosón, had the idea of improving the very poor impression that Francoist Spain had abroad, showing the image of a modern and tolerant Spain. They commissioned the task of creating a special intended to participate in the most important international television festivals at the time to Narciso Ibáñez Serrador. He created, along with Jaime de Armiñán, what was to be named Historia de la censura a television special with an ironic subtle sense of humor evidencing the censorship in Francoist Spain. But they suffered the censorship themselves and had to change the name to Historia de la frivolidad.

The special was sent to the Monte-Carlo Television Festival whose organization demanded that, to participate in the competition, the special had to have been broadcast. So, it was broadcast on February 9, 1967, without promotion, almost at midnight and after the National Anthem that marked the end of the channel's daily broadcast.

Cast

 Irene Gutiérrez Caba
 Margot Cottens
 Rafaela Aparicio
 Pilar Muñoz
 Lola Gaos
 Luis Morris
 Teresa Gimpera
 Josefina Serratosa
 Mary Paz Pondal
 Regine Gobin
 Enrique Navarro
 Antonio Riquelme
 Narciso Ibáñez Menta
 Emilio Laguna
 Irán Eory
 Cris Huerta
 Ricardo Palacios
 Luis Sánchez Polack
 Fernando Santos
 Tomás Zori
 Diana Darvey
 Agustín González
 Fernando Rey
 Ketty De la Cámara 
 Beatriz Savon
 Jaime Blanch
 José Luis Coll
 Álvaro de Luna
 Javier De Paul
 Pedro Sempson
 José María Prada
 Emilio Gutiérrez Caba
 Alberto Berco
 Roberto Llamas
 Manuel Codeso
 Paloma Valdés
 Elisa Montés

Legacy

In popular culture
The ladies of the Women's League against Frivolity were the precursors of the characters from Tacañón del Todo, the negative part at Ibáñez Serrador game show Un, dos, tres... responda otra vez.

Accolades

References

External links
 Historia de la frivolidad at rtve.es

1967 television specials
RTVE shows
Films scored by Augusto Algueró